Rye is a cereal crop.

Rye may also refer to:

Rye whiskey, made primarily from rye grain
Rye bread, made with rye flour

Places

Settlements

United Kingdom
Rye, East Sussex, England
Rye, Hampshire

United States
Rye, Arizona
Rye, Arkansas
Rye, Colorado
Rye, Florida, 
Rye, Missouri
Rye, New Hampshire
Rye (city), New York
Town of Rye, New York
Rye, Texas

Elsewhere
Rye, Victoria, Australia
Old Rye (Gammel Rye), Denmark 
Rye, Jura, France

Streams
River Rye (disambiguation), two rivers in the British Isles
The Rye (brook), a tributary of the River Mole in Surrey, England

Transportation
Rye railway station (disambiguation)
Sportsklubben Rye, a cycling club in Oslo, Norway

Other
Rye (surname)
Rye (novel), an erotic novel by Sam Rosenthal
Ryegrass or Lolium, a bluegrass genus
"The Rye", an episode of the TV series Seinfeld
Rotary Youth Exchange, a student exchange program
Roush-Yates Engines, a partnership between the engines divisions of RFK Racing and Yates Racing

See also

Rai (unit), unit of area